Sergei Sergeyevich Fedin (born 31 December 1981) is a former Russian professional football player.

Club career
He played two seasons in the Russian Football National League for FC Sodovik Sterlitamak.

References

1981 births
Sportspeople from Oryol
Living people
Russian footballers
Association football midfielders
FC Lokomotiv Moscow players
FC Sodovik Sterlitamak players
FC Oryol players
FC Dynamo Bryansk players
FC Fakel Voronezh players
FC Spartak Tambov players
FC Khimik Dzerzhinsk players